Mepuri is an extinct Arawakan language of Brazil that was spoken around the confluence of the Rio Negro and Japurá River, mainly on the Marié River and Curicuriari River. A word list was collected by Johann Natterer in 1831.

References

Arawakan languages
Languages of Brazil